Pineridge is a parliamentary constituency represented in the House of Assembly of the Bahamas created in 1977. It elects one Member of Parliament (MP) using a first past the post system. It is held by the Progressive Liberal Party (PLP) and has Ginger Moxey as its MP.

Members of Parliament

Elections

References

Constituencies of the Bahamas
Constituencies established in 1977